A Chilling Cosplay is a 2013 Chinese-Hong Kong crime thriller film directed by Wang Guangli and starring Simon Yam, Vivian Hsu, Ying Er and Yuan Hong.

Plot
During a period of time, two cases of murder occurred in the community. The victims include a young woman, whose corpse is said to have been frozen by the murderer using a special technique and being dressed up in a costume afterwards before being discarded like a mere doll. Police Captain Fang Youwei (Simon Yam) and his partner Yan Xiaotong (Ying Er), alongside newly recruited officer Xiao Kai (Yuan Hong) investigate this case. They find out that the two victims were college classmates ten years ago, and also stayed in the same cosplay club. Fang approaches Zhou Jin (Vivian Hsu), who was classmates with the two victims. The appearance of Zhou lends the case a new direction and she seems to be the next target of the murderer.

The murderer hides in the shadow sharpening his blade, grinning in his hatred towards the 3 women. He has waited years to seek merciless revenge. In the era of moral turpitude, everything is fearless, life is worthless.

Cast
Simon Yam as Fang Youwei (方友為)
Vivian Hsu as Zhou Jin (周瑾)
Ying Er as Yan Xiaotong (嚴曉童)
Yuan Hong as Xiao Kai (肖凯)
Chen Sicheng as Chen Ansheng (陳岸生)
Gao Qunshu
Liu Yiwei
Wu Yue
Li Ai
Ou Di
Winnie Leung
Wu Qingqing
Zhao Xioasu
Huang Biru
Yan Jingyao

See also
Wong Jing filmography

References

External links

A Chilling Cosplay at Douban Movie

2013 films
2013 crime thriller films
2010s mystery thriller films
2013 psychological thriller films
Chinese crime thriller films
Chinese detective films
Hong Kong detective films
Hong Kong crime thriller films
Hong Kong mystery thriller films
Police detective films
2010s Mandarin-language films
Golden Harvest films
Hong Kong serial killer films
2010s Hong Kong films